The Marion County School District is a public school district based in Marion County, Mississippi (USA). The superintendent is Mr. Carl-Michael Day, Ed.S.

Schools

High Schools (Grades 7-12)
East Marion High School Eagles
West Marion High School Trojans

Elementary Schools (Grades 4-6)
East Marion Elementary School
West Marion Elementary School

Primary Schools (Grades K-3)
East Marion Primary School
West Marion Primary School

Demographics

2006-07 school year
There were a total of 2,534 students enrolled in the Marion County School District during the 2006–2007 school year. The gender makeup of the district was 47% female and 53% male. The racial makeup of the district was 44.12% African American, 55.33% White, 0.43% Hispanic, 0.08% Asian, and 0.04% Native American. 71.0% of the district's students were eligible to receive free lunch.

Previous school years

Accountability statistics

See also
List of school districts in Mississippi
Foxworth, Mississippi

References

External links
 

Education in Marion County, Mississippi
School districts in Mississippi